Maple Canyon may refer to:

Maple Canyon (San Pitch Mountains), a canyon in Utah
Maple Canyon (Spanish Fork Peak), another canyon in Utah